Triptychus niveus is a species of small sea snail, a marine gastropod mollusk in the family Pyramidellidae, the pyrams and their allies.

Description
The shell grows to a length of 9.5 mm. The white shell is slender. The whorls of the teleoconch are flattened, each with three spiral ribs, the two upper ones nodulous. The body whorl has two plain ribs below the nodulous ones, and three revolving ridges below the periphery, forming columellar folds. The aperture is produced below.

Distribution
This species occurs in the following locations:
 Aruba
 Belize
 Bonaire
 Caribbean Sea
 Cayman Islands
 Colombia
 Costa Rica
 Cuba
 Curaçao
 Gulf of Mexico
 Lesser Antilles
 Mexico
 Panama
 Puerto Rico

References

 Dall, W. H. 1884. On a collection of shells sent from Florida by Mr. Henry Hemphill. Proceedings of the United States National Museum 6(384): 318–342, pl. 10

External links
 To Biodiversity Heritage Library (7 publications)
 To Encyclopedia of Life
 To USNM Invertebrate Zoology Mollusca Collection
 To ITIS
 To World Register of Marine Species

Pyramidellidae
Gastropods described in 1875